The 2014 Malaysia FA Cup, also known as the Astro Piala FA due to the competition's sponsorship by Astro Arena, was the 25th season of the Malaysia FA Cup, a knockout competition for Malaysia's state football association and clubs.

Kelantan were the defending champions. Pahang FA lift the cup at Shah Alam Stadium on 7 June 2014 after defeating Felda United F.C. 2–1.

Pahang FA has qualified for the 2015 AFC Cup as the competition winner.

Teams

Format

30 teams will participate in this tournament instead of 32 in the 2013 edition. 2013 winners Kelantan and runners-up Johor Darul Takzim have received byes for this edition and will progress straight into the Round of 16.

Just like the previous edition, the first two rounds would be single matches. The quarter finals and semi finals would be played over two legs while the final will be played at Shah Alam Stadium, Shah Alam between Pahang FA and Felda United, on 7 June.

Matches
The draw for the Piala FA 2014 was held at Blue Wave Hotel, Shah Alam on 29 November 2013.

Bracket

Round of 32

The first round will commence on 21 & 22 January 2014.

Round of 16
The second round will commence on 4 February 2014.

1 Johor were awarded a 3–0 victory due to T-Team walking off at half time with the result at 2–1 to Johor.

Quarter-finals

First leg

Second leg

Semi-finals

First leg

Second leg

Final

The final was held at Shah Alam Stadium on 7 June 2014.

Season statistics

Top scorers

See also
 2014 Malaysia Super League
 2014 Malaysia Premier League
 2014 Malaysia FAM League
 2014 Malaysia Cup

References

 
2014 domestic association football cups
FA